Brunei–Spain relations refers to foreign relations between Brunei and Spain. They established diplomatic relations in 1984. Brunei has no embassy in Spain, but his embassy in Paris, France, is accredited to Spain. Spain has no embassy in Brunei but its embassy in Kuala Lumpur, Malaysia, is accredited for Brunei.

History
In 1521, Ferdinand Magellan encountered Brunei and its surrounding territories while traversing the world on behalf of Spain. In 1578, as Spain began its expansion in South East Asia from its base in the Philippines, Spanish ambitions ultimately clashed with the Bruneian Empire. For four months, Spanish forces (which included Filipino and Mexican soldiers from its territory of New Spain) clashed with Bruneian forces which also included Ottoman soldiers. Spanish forces managed to invade the Bruneian capital of Mukim Kota Batu. Ultimately, Spain managed to gain control of all present-day islands of the Philippines which were previously under Bruneian control. This conflict became known as the Castilian War.

Diplomatic relations 
Spain and Brunei established diplomatic relations in June 1984. Spain does not have a resident Embassy in Brunei, managing issues related to the Sultanate the Embassy of Spain in Kuala Lumpur (Malaysia). Brunei also does not have an Embassy resident in Spain, managing issues related to Spain from the Embassy of the Sultanate of Brunei in Paris. Bilateral relations are cordial thanks to the absence of disputes and the relations that the Sultan and his family have with the Spanish Royal Family, if
Well still, below its potential.

Cooperation 
UNDP places Brunei in the category of developed countries according to the Human Development Index published annually. Brunei is not considered by the Spanish authorities as a priority country for development cooperation. There is no Technical Cooperation Office of Spain in Brunei.

See also
 Foreign relations of Brunei
 Foreign relations of Spain

References 

 
Spain
Brunei